The 1993–94 Bulgarian Hockey League season was the 42nd season of the Bulgarian Hockey League, the top level of ice hockey in Bulgaria. Four teams participated in the league, and HK Slavia Sofia won the championship.

Standings

Bulgar
Bulgarian Hockey League seasons
Bulg